Toxodera hauseri is a species of praying mantis found in Thailand, Malay Peninsula, Java, and Borneo. However, there are no records of a Bornean specimen of T. hauseri, only a photographic record from Poring Hot Springs. This species closely resembles T. fimbriata but is distinguished by the greater width of the leaf-like expansions of the medial femurs.

Etymology
Named after Austrian entomologist, Dr. Bernd Hauser.

See also

List of mantis genera and species

References

Mantidae
Mantodea of Asia
Insects described in 2009